Walter Edward Foster  (April 9, 1873 – November 14, 1947) was a Canadian politician and businessman in New Brunswick.

Early life 

Foster was born in St. Martins, New Brunswick. He began work as a clerk with the Bank of New Brunswick at Saint John. He joined the merchant firm of Vassie and Company and became vice president and managing director after marrying Johanna Vassie, daughter of the firm's head. Active in community business affairs, Foster served as President of the Saint John Board of Trade in 1908–1909.

Political career  

In 1916, Walter Foster became leader of the province's Liberal Party which swept to victory in the 1917 election. Foster was defeated in the Saint John County riding in the 1917 election but was elected to the Legislative Assembly by acclamation in a by-election later that year in Victoria County. Though leader at age 45, he was called the "boy premier" for his youthful, cleancut appearance (Doyle). His government established the first department of health in 1918, gave women the right to vote in 1919 and created the province's power commission in 1920.

Walter Foster resigned from provincial politics on February 1, 1923 in order to return to put his own failing personal finances in order. He entered federal politics becoming Secretary of State of Canada in 1925, but failed to win a seat in that year's federal election.

In 1928, Walter Foster was appointed by Prime Minister Mackenzie King to the Senate of Canada and served as Speaker of the Senate of Canada from 1936 to 1940.

Personal life and death 

Foster married Joanna Vassie in 1903. His son, Walter William Vassie Foster, served in the provincial Legislative Assembly.

He died in office in Saint John at the age of 74 and was buried in the Cedar Hill Cemetery.

References
 
 Government of New Brunswick biography (pdf)

Further reading
 Arthur T. Doyle, Front Benches and Back Rooms: A story of corruption, muckraking, raw partisanship and political intrigue in New Brunswick, Toronto: Green Tree Publishing, 1976.

1873 births
1947 deaths
Businesspeople from New Brunswick
Premiers of New Brunswick
Speakers of the Senate of Canada
Candidates in the 1925 Canadian federal election
Candidates in the 1926 Canadian federal election
Liberal Party of Canada senators
Canadian senators from New Brunswick
Members of the King's Privy Council for Canada
Canadian Anglicans
People from Saint John County, New Brunswick
Liberal Party of Canada candidates for the Canadian House of Commons